Scot Sothern (born 1949) is an American photographer and writer. He has created controversial black and white photographs of prostitutes in Southern California, whom he photographed from 1986 to 1990. In 2010, he began photographing and writing about sex workers in Skid Row, Los Angeles. Sothern described the photographs as exposés that expose both the women and also the artist behind the camera.

Biography
Scot Sothern was born to a portrait and wedding photographer in the Missouri Ozarks. He spent 40 unsettled years selling freelance photography in the US and abroad. His first solo exhibit, Lowlife, was held at the Drkrm Gallery in Los Angeles in 2010. His first book, Lowlife, was published in the U.K. by Stanley Barker in 2011 and as an ebook by powerHouse Books in 2013. The British Journal of Photography called Lowlife "The year's most controversial photobook". Curb Service: A Memoir, was published by Soft Skull Press in July 2013, and Streetwalkers was published by PowerHouse Books in 2016. Sothern has been in solo and group shows in NYC, Miami, and Los Angeles as well as Ottawa, London, Basel and Paris. In 2013 and 2014, Scot wrote 52 photo-illustrated columns for Vice Magazine: Sothern Exposure and Nocturnal Submissions.  In 2017 Sothern's novel BigCity was published by Stalking Horse Press.

Reception
In 2011, The British Journal of Photography commenting on Lowlife wrote, "Scot Sothern makes this year's most controversial photobook".

Roger Ballen in 2021 opined, "Scot Sothern has bravely and empathetically entered a hidden world of humanity. A place where the human condition bares itself on all levels. This penetrating book of photographs and text will haunt and challenge the viewer".

Exhibitions
 2022 These Days - Generations, a solo show, Family Tree Vintage Chibachrome prints; IDENTITY, antique ambrotype plates with contemporary archival transparencies
 2018 The Door Gallery, Hollywood, CA. Group show and literary reading
 2018 Cal State University, Dominguez Hills, CA, Flesh & Stone, Paired Photos, Scot Sothern & Andy Romanoff
 2017 Noh/Wave Gallery, Los Angeles, CA, I AM a group exhibition, Vintage Prints and New Work
 2016, Little Big Man Gallery, Los Angeles, CA - Streetwalkers, Vintage Prints
 2015, Mindy Solomon Gallery, Miami, FL – Sad City - The Way We See It, Scot Sothern & Muir Vidler
 2010, DRKRM, Los Angeles, US
 2012, La Petite Mort Gallery, Ottawa, Ontario, Canada
 2012, The Great Eastern Bear, London, UK
 2013, DRKRM, Los Angeles, US. A New Low
 2015, Daniel Cooney Fine Art, NYC Lowlife, Vintage, 1985 – 1991
 2014, Photo LA – A New Low & Lowlife – drkrm Gallery
 2013, Space Eight Gallery, St. Augustine, FL – Rise of the Art Dorks, group show.
 2013, Mindy Solomon Gallery, Miami, FL – Post Coital, group show
 2013, Balzer ART projects – Basel, Switzerland, Subversive Narratives, group show
 2012, Mindy Solomon Gallery, Miami, FL – Explicit Content, group show
 2011 DRKRM Gallery, Los Angeles, Street Life, a group show
 2011 BC Space Gallery, Laguna Beach, CA, Capital Crimes, a group show
 2010 New Puppy Gallery, Los Angeles, Framed Stories, group show
 1991 Marge Neikrug Gallery, NYC. Rated X, group show

Bibliography
 Sothern, Scot. 2011. Lowlife. London: Stanley Barker .
 Sothern, Scot. 2013. Curb Service, a Memoir. Soft Skull Press .
 Sothern, Scot. 2013. An American Lowlife, digital book.
 Sothern, Scot. 2015  Sad City Straylight Press 
 Sothern, Scot. 2016. Streetwalkers. PowerHouse Books, 
 Sothern, Scot. 2017. Big City.  Stalking Horse Press, 
Sothern, Scot 2019 Little Miss.  drkrm Editions,

References 

Scot Sothern - Little Big Man Gallery

External links
Official Website
"Virkelighetshunger" ("Reality Hunger"), interview in Natt&Dag, February 20, 2013 (in Norwegian).
Interview on The Airship ("Follow Your Hard-On: An Interview with Scot Sothern", The Airship).
Video Interview with Scot Sothern (Daniel Rolnik, August 18, 2013)
Interview on GUP Magazine ("A New Low: An Interview with Scot Sothern", GUP Magazine, August 17, 2013).
Interview on The Rumpus ("The Rumpus Interview with Scot Sothern", The Rumpus, January 15, 2014).
Interview on L'Oeil de la Photographie ("Scot Sothern – Then and Now", L'Oeil de la Photographie, January 21, 2015).
1985 - Artist
CURB SERVICE by Scot Sothern | Kirkus Reviews
photo-eye | Magazine -- Lowlife
Scot Sothern Issue Magazine 2017 Interview with Scot Sothern
Scot Sothern : Sad City
Scot Sothern VICE - Sothern Exposure - Nocturnal Submissions
 Podcast - interview with Scot Sothern
https://www.amazon.com/Streetwalkers-Scot-Sothern/dp/1576877612/ref=sr_1_4?s=books&ie=UTF8&qid=1427152267&sr=1-4

American male writers
Living people
1950 births
Place of birth missing (living people)
Artists from Los Angeles
21st-century American writers
Photographers from Kansas